Jesse Chew House is located in the Sewell section of Mantua Township, Gloucester County, New Jersey, United States. The house was built in 1772 and was added to the National Register of Historic Places on October 18, 1972.

See also
National Register of Historic Places listings in Gloucester County, New Jersey

References

Houses on the National Register of Historic Places in New Jersey
Houses completed in 1772
Houses in Gloucester County, New Jersey
National Register of Historic Places in Gloucester County, New Jersey
New Jersey Register of Historic Places
Mantua Township, New Jersey